The men's 4 x 100 metres relay event at the 2015 Summer Universiade was held on 11 and 12 July at the Gwangju Universiade Main Stadium.

Medalists

* Athletes who competed in heats only.

Results

Heats
Qualification: First 2 teams of each heat (Q) plus the next 2 fastest (q) qualified for the final.

Final

References

Relay
2015